Thoracophorini is a tribe of unmargined rove beetles in the family Staphylinidae. There are at least three genera and about six described species in Thoracophorini.

Genera
These three genera belong to the tribe Thoracophorini:
 Clavilispinus Bernhauer, 1926 i c g b
 Nacaeus Blackwelder, 1942 i c g b
 Thoracophorus Motschulsky, 1837 i c g b
Data sources: i = ITIS, c = Catalogue of Life, g = GBIF, b = Bugguide.net

References

Further reading

External links

 

Osoriinae